Enhanced Voice Services (EVS) is a superwideband speech audio coding standard that was developed for VoLTE. It offers up to 20 kHz audio bandwidth and has high robustness to delay jitter and packet losses due to its channel aware coding and improved packet loss concealment. It has been developed in 3GPP and is described in 3GPP TS 26.441. The application areas of EVS consist of improved telephony and teleconferencing, audiovisual conferencing services, and streaming audio. Source code of both decoder and encoder in ANSI C is available as 3GPP TS 26.442 and is being updated regularly. Samsung uses the term HD+ when doing a call using EVS.

History 

Work on EVS was started in 2007. The standardization process lasted from 2010 to 2014, being completed in December 2014 with 3GPP Release 12.  The codec was developed collaboratively among chipset, handset and infrastructure manufacturers as well as operators and technology providers. 

GSMA requires EVS for their HD Voice+ Logo Licensing Program.

The six patent holders are Fraunhofer IIS, JVC Kenwood, Nippon Telegraph and Telephone, NTT Docomo, Panasonic, and Ericsson. Other contributors included Huawei, Nokia, Orange, Qualcomm, Samsung Electronics, VoiceAge, and ZTE Corporation. A patent pool for EVS has been listed by MPEG LA.

Technology 

EVS employs similar concepts to its predecessors, such as AMR-WB, to which it retains backward-compatibility. It switches  between speech and audio compression modes depending on the content, using ACELP and MDCT.

The following features are present in EVS:
 source-controlled variable bit-rate (SC-VBR)
 voice/sound activity detector (VAD)
 comfort noise generation (CNG)
 error concealment (EC) for packet loss in networks
 channel-aware mode to improve frame/packet error resilience
 jitter buffer management (JBM)
Input sampling rates for EVS can be 8, 16, 32, and 48 kHz. It supports the following bitrates (in kbps) for different bandwidths:

 Narrowband (NB): 5.9, 7.2, 8, 9.6, 13.2, 16.4, 24.4
 Wideband (WB): 5.9, 7.2, 8, 9.6, 13.2, 13.2 channel-aware, 16.4, 24.4, 32, 48, 64, 96, 128 (6.6 ~ 23.85 for AMR-WB IO)
 Super-wideband (SWB): 9.6, 13.2, 13.2 channel-aware, 16.4, 24.4, 32, 48, 64, 96, 128
 Fullband (FB): 16.4, 24.4, 32, 48, 64, 96, 128
Bitrates can be switched every 20 ms.

Subjective listening tests conducted by Nokia concluded that EVS offers significantly improved quality over AMR and AMR-WB at all operating points.

Adoption 
Operators which have launched EVS powered VoLTE services include:

 
 NTT DoCoMo
 T-Mobile USA
 T-Mobile Polska
 Vodafone Germany
 Vodafone Romania
 Orange Romania
 Orange France
 Free France
 SK Telecom
 KT Corporation
 LG Uplus
 Deutsche Telekom
 KDDI Japan
 China Mobile
 EE United Kingdom
 Vodafone Netherlands
 KPN Netherlands
 Airtel India
 A1 Telekom Austria
 3 Austria
 Swisscom
 Verizon Communications
 Turkcell
 TIM
 Wind Tre
 Vodafone Idea (V!) India
 Telekom Hungary
 Telenor Hungary
 Vodafone New Zealand
 Magyar Telekom

Currently there are about 200 models from different smartphones manufacturers supporting EVS, including:

 Apple
 Samsung
 Google
 HTC
 Huawei
 LG
 Motorola
 Nokia
 Panasonic
 Sony
 Xiaomi

Interoperability 
Inter-carrier interoperability is a problem, as calls are by default routed over narrowband connections which downgrades the voice to narrowband quality instead of EVS and HD Voice even if the individual phones and carrier networks all support EVS. Thus, users are encouraged to switch from phone calls to pure VoIP apps such as FaceTime, Google Duo, WhatsApp, Facebook Messenger, and/or Telegram when voice call quality remains poor despite good network connectivity.

Licensing 
EVS, like AMR-WB and AMR-WB+, incorporates several patents. As with those two codecs, VoiceAge Corporation is in charge of the licensing and offers RAND pricing

See also 
 Comparison of audio coding formats

References

External links 
Enhanced Voice Services Codec for LTE
 VoiceAge – EVS
The 3GPP Enhanced Voice Services (EVS) codec
 Fraunhofer Technical Paper – Enhanced Voice Services (EVS) Codec

Audio codecs
Speech codecs
Wideband codecs